Laurent Furst (born 19 May 1965) is a French politician of the Republicans who has been serving as a deputy of the National Assembly since 2012, representing Bas-Rhin's 6th constituency.

Political career
Furst was elected to the National Assembly in 2012 having served as mayor of Molsheim since 1995. In parliament, he serves on the Defence Committee. In addition to his committee assignments, he is a member of the French-Slovakian Parliamentary Friendship Group.

Political positions
In the Republicans’ 2016 presidential primaries, Furst endorsed Jean-François Copé as the party’s candidate for the office of President of France. In the Republicans’ 2017 leadership election, he endorsed Laurent Wauquiez.

References

1965 births
Living people
People from Colmar
The Republicans (France) politicians
Deputies of the 14th National Assembly of the French Fifth Republic
Deputies of the 15th National Assembly of the French Fifth Republic
Mayors of places in Grand Est
Members of Parliament for Bas-Rhin